Vladimir Savel'evich Buslaev (Владимир Савельевич Буслаев, 19 April 1937, Leningrad – 14 March 2012) was a Russian mathematical physicist.

Education
Buslajew received his Ph.D. (Russian candidate degree) in 1963 from the University of Leningrad under Olga Ladyzhenskaya with thesis Short-Wave Asymptotics of Diffraction Problems in Convex Domains. He was a professor at Saint Petersburg State University.

Contributions
He did research on mathematical problems of diffraction and the WKB method.

Recognition
In 1963 he received the prize of the Leningrad Mathematical Society.

In 1983 he was an invited speaker at the International Congress of Mathematicians in Warsaw and gave a talk Regularization of many particle scattering. He received an honorary doctorate from the Université Paris Nord. In 2000 he received the State Prize of the Russian Federation and he was an Honoured Scientist of the Russian Federation. In 2000 he gave a plenary lecture (Adiabatic perturbations of linear periodic problems) at the annual meeting of the German Mathematical Society in Dresden.

Selected publications
with Vladimir Borisovich Matveev: 

with Vincenzo Grecchi: 
with Catherine Sulem:

References

External links
 Памяти Владимира Савельевича Буслаева (Journal of the Saint Petersburg State University, Number 3847, 14. April 2012)

1937 births
2012 deaths
Scientists from Saint Petersburg
Saint Petersburg State University alumni
Academic staff of Saint Petersburg State University
Mathematical physicists
20th-century Russian mathematicians
21st-century Russian mathematicians